Pamela Coke-Hamilton is a Caribbean lawyer and trade expert who has been serving as Executive Director of the International Trade Centre (ITC) since 2020.

Early life and education 
Coke-Hamilton went to school in Jamaica at Manchester High School in Mandeville, Jamaica. She attended the University of the West Indies where she graduated in Economics and International Relations. She went on to study in Washington, D.C. where she earned Doctor of Law from Georgetown University Law Center.

Career 
Coke-Hamilton began her career in Jamaica's Ministry of Foreign Affairs and Foreign Trade.

From 2007, Coke-Hamilton served as Director of Trade, Tourism and Competitiveness of the Organization of American States (OAS). to 2009. In 2008 she gave evidence to the United States International Trade Commission about Caribbean trade.

From 2011 until 2019, Coke-Hamilton served as Executive Director of the Caribbean Export Development Agency (CEDA). During her time in office, she established a "Caribbean exporter of the Year" and a "Women Empowered through Export Platform".

In November 2019, Pamela Coke-Hamilton warned of the lose-lose trade war that was emerging between the USA and China. It was damaging to all the consumers involved and it "compromises the stability of the global economy and future growth".

In 2020, United Nations Secretary-General António Guterres appointed Coke-Hamilton as Executive Director of the International Trade Centre (ITC).

Other activities 
 International Gender Champions (IGC), Member (since 2020)

Recognition 
Coke-Hamilton was awarded an honorary doctorate by the University of the West Indies in recognition of the help she had given in helping them to establish a masters course in International Trade Policy.

Publications include
 Accelerating Trade and Integration in the Caribbean: Policy Options for Sustained Growth, Job Creation, and Poverty Reduction, 2009, World Bank (co-author).

References

Year of birth missing (living people)
Living people
Georgetown University Law Center alumni
Jamaican women lawyers
University of the West Indies alumni